The Last Blade is a fighting game developed and released by SNK for the Neo Geo system in 1997. It was also ported to several home systems. A sequel, The Last Blade 2, was released in 1998.

The game takes place during the Bakumatsu era in Japan, and incorporates various elements of Japanese mythology (with a heavy emphasis on the symbology of the Four Symbols). As such, the background music generally incorporates synthesized instruments simulating a sound appropriate to the 19th century setting, in a Western classical, pseudo-Romantic style (unusual for a fighting game).

Gameplay 

The Last Blade series is seen as a spiritual offshoot to SNK's popular Samurai Shodown series, due to it being a similar 2D weapons-based fighting game. It also took over several elements from cancelled Technōs/Face's Dragon's Heaven (which tentatively was named DarkSeed). The gameplay is characterised by two selectable fighting styles, and a unique combo system along with a "deflect" system which involves pressing the D button at an opponent's attack. Upon deflecting, the opponent is left open to attack.

The two styles are Speed mode and Power mode. Speed mode allows players to chain several normal attacks into a special or desperation/super move, as well as execute a Speed Combo. Power mode on the other hand, grants the player increased damage potential exponentially and gives access to Super Desperation Moves, which inflict an exorbitant amount of damage (performing them however, requires the player's life bar to flash and have a full power bar). Power mode also allows the player to perform Super Cancels; canceling a special move into a desperation/super move (but not a desperation move, with the sole exception of Awakened Kaede in the first game).

Characters

All of the characters in the Last Blade series are of Japanese origin, excluding Lee Rekka, who is from China, and Yuki, who is from Russia. Some characters, such as Akatsuki Musashi and Lee Rekka, are based on historical or legendary figures. A number of characters from the Last Blade series also appeared in SNK Playmore's Neo Geo Battle Coliseum.

Versions and re-releases 
The Last Blade was subsequently bundled with the sequel The Last Blade 2 for a PlayStation 2 compilation released only in Japan titled Bakumatsu Roman Gekka no Kenshi 1･2 on January 12, 2006; both games are arcade perfect emulations of the original games. The PlayStation version was re-released for PlayStation 3 via PlayStation Network in Asia on May 31, 2007, and later for Vita.

It was re-released for Wii via the Virtual Console by D4 Enterprise in Japan on March 13, 2012, in North America on June 7, 2012, and in PAL regions on August 2, 2012.

A version for Microsoft Windows, OS X, Linux and asm.js developed by DotEmu was released by SNK Playmore as part of the Humble NEOGEO 25th Anniversary Bundle on December 8, 2015. It was released on Steam on August 31, 2016, and on GOG.com on May 30, 2017.

Hamster Corporation re-released the game as part of their ACA Neo Geo series for Xbox One via Xbox Games Store on May 18, 2017; for PlayStation 4 via PlayStation Store in Japan on May 18, 2017, in PAL regions on May 25, 2017, and in North America on June 15, 2017; for Nintendo Switch via Nintendo eShop on December 14, 2017; and for Windows 10 via Microsoft Store on February 28, 2018.

Reception 

In Japan, Game Machine listed The Last Blade on their January 1, 1998 issue as being the most popular arcade game at the time. According to Famitsu, the Neo Geo CD version sold over 22,735 copies in its first week on the market. Rafael Fernández Barbero of Spanish magazine Loading gave the PlayStation port a positive outlook.

Notes

References

External links 
 
 The Last Blade at GameFAQs
 The Last Blade at Giant Bomb
 The Last Blade at Killer List of Videogames
 The Last Blade at MobyGames

1997 video games
ACA Neo Geo games
Arcade video games
Fighting games used at the Super Battle Opera tournament
D4 Enterprise games
Neo Geo games
Neo Geo CD games
Multiplayer and single-player video games
Nintendo Switch games
PlayStation (console) games
PlayStation Network games
PlayStation 4 games
SNK franchises
SNK games
SNK Playmore games
Fighting games
2D fighting games
Video game franchises
Video games based on Japanese mythology
Virtual Console games
Windows games
Xbox One games
Video games developed in Japan
Hamster Corporation games